Johan Asplund (born December 15, 1980 in Skutskär, Sweden) is a goaltender for the Nordsjælland Cobras hockey team in the Danish Oddset Ligaen. He has also played seven seasons in Elitserien for Brynäs IF and most recently Timrå IK.

Professional career

External links 
 Johan Asplund on Internet Hockey Database

References 

 
 
 

1980 births
Living people
Swedish ice hockey goaltenders
Swedish expatriate ice hockey players in Denmark
Brynäs IF players
Mora IK players
Nyköpings Hockey players
Timrå IK players
New York Rangers draft picks